Phase integral may refer to:

Phase integral, in statistical mechanics, a classical analog to the partition function.  
Phase integral, in astronomy, a concept related to bond albedo.